is a fictional character in the Capcom's Street Fighter series. She made her first appearance in the manga Sakura Ganbaru!, and makes her first appearance as a playable video game character in the 1998 video game Street Fighter Alpha 3. Within the series, Karin is originally designated as a rival to fellow street fighter Sakura Kasugano, and a counterpoint to R. Mika as a fighting game character. She is reintroduced in Street Fighter V as one of 16 characters playable at launch, and appears as a major character in the game's story mode. She is voiced in Japanese by Miho Yamada in Alpha 3 and subsequent appearances in other games, and by Aya Endo for Street Fighter V. Endo's English counterpart for Karin is Lauren Landa.

Though the character has few overall appearances in the series, Karin has remained consistently popular with players, and is noted as the character of choice for Street Fighter V by several prominent professional players of fighting games.

Character design and appearances
Karin Kanzuki originally appears as Sakura's schoolmate in Masahiko Nakahira's Street Fighter: Sakura Ganbaru! manga, published between 1996 and 1998. Karin's rivalry with Sakura is analogous to the relationship between Ken and Ryu, the difference being her personality is "colder and more self-centered".  Her last name is a tribute to Masaomi Kanzaki, a manga artist that worked on Street Fighter II related manga in the early 1990s. Karin's first video game appearance was originally meant to be Marvel Super Heroes vs. Street Fighter, but was ultimately cut. She was later integrated into the Street Fighter video game series as a playable character in Street Fighter Alpha 3. The developmental team for Street Fighter Alpha 3 introduced Karin to provide a contrast to R. Mika, a character designed to be "tricky and technical". For her original appearance in Street Fighter Alpha 3, Karin, like that of her rival Sakura, wears a sailor fuku with a predominantly red color scheme and a blue bola tie. Her hair is styled into long, oversized ringlets in a European Victorian-era fashion. Her fighting style is Kanzuki-ryū kakutōjutsu, a mixed martial arts style she claims to have created herself.

Within series lore, Karin is concepted as the only daughter of an ultra-rich corporate family, who behaves like a stereotypical elitist rich girl with an obnoxious laugh. She is attended to by at least two employees who serve as her butlers. Her original motivation was to "be the winner of everything", and resorts to travel the world to track down and defeat Sakura to redress a prior loss at her hands. Later in the Sakura Ganbaru! series, Karin buys most of the shares of the family-owned corporation Kanzuki Zaibatsu and ousts her father as its leader. In spite of this, he muses to himself that she has excellent potential, although he originally desired a son.

Karin appears as a playable character in the crossover game Namco x Capcom, where she is paired with Sakura. She is also playable in Capcom Fighting Evolution.

Karin is a playable character in Street Fighter V, and retains the same mannerisms and personality quirks observed in her previous appearances. She is redesigned with full tight leggings and a martial coat with frilly long sleeves. In V, Karin plays a large role as the one who coordinates the efforts of her anti-Shadaloo faction in raiding M. Bison's main base, leading to his final defeat.

Gameplay 
Alex Donaldson from VG247 described Karin's iteration in Street Fighter V as a character primarily focused around offense; while she lacks projectile attacks, she has far-reaching moves that can get her from one side of the screen to the other with ease and numerous moves that can chain off each other, as well as a powerful V-Trigger mode. Michael McWhertor from Polygon classified Karin as a "rekka-style fighter", and explained that her special moves can be chained together for multiple controller inputs, which gives the player a wide variety of mix-up options to keep their opponents guessing, which puts her player at an advantage against opponents who are not knowledgeable of her move set. Her V-Skill maneuver is a lunging punch, and the longer the player holds down the medium punch and medium kick inputs, the more powerful Karin's final attack will be. Karin's V-Skill is also capable of nullifying projectiles from other fighters. Chris Carter from Destructoid observed that most of Karin's command attacks are simple quarter circle commands, coupled with any punch or kick. Carter also found that she can dash forward and backwards into somewhat complicated chains, such a forward dash which turns into an uppercut, that must be executed perfectly by the player for optimal play.

Promotion and merchandise
Kotobukiya released a bishoujo-style figurine of Karin's appearance from Street Fighter Alpha in June 2019. Karin appears on the cover of volume 1 of the 2022 Street Fighter Swimsuit Special.

Reception
Karin is mostly well received. She was voted the fourth most popular Street Fighter character in Capcom's 2002 poll for the 15th anniversary of the original Street Fighter, after Chun-Li, Cammy and Sakura. She ranked 7th in the worldwide rankings in an official Street Fighter character poll organized by Capcom in 2013. In an official poll held by Namco, Karin was the most requested Street Fighter side character to be added to the roster of Tekken X Street Fighter with 18.74% of the vote. She is placed at 18th in a worldwide Street Fighter character poll held between 2017 and 2018.

Prior to her confirmation for the roster of Street Fighter V, Heavy.com listed Karin as one of the most underrated Street Fighter characters, and one they wanted to see in future installments, where they stated "her mix-up game could be something fierce if Capcom ever brought her over to these new SF games." UGO.com included her in their list of top 50 Street Fighter characters, and praised Karin as a great foil who gave Sakura a bit more depth behind her cute "I want to be Ryu" shtick. Den of Geek placed Karin fifteen in a ranking list of Street Fighter characters, noting that while she has a massive ego and "should by all means be a villain with the way she holds herself above the common folk", her opposition to Bison's Shadaloo organization and her sponsorship of R. Mika's career shows her benevolent side and that she is "not at all a terrible person". Her role in the story mode of Street Fighter V is compared to Nick Fury in the Marvel Cinematic Universe as she assembles her own team of world warriors to thwart Shadaloo, and that she "really gets to shine and be her own person" since her characterization no longer hinges on her relationship with Sakura.

Carter found Karin's iteration in V to be fun with "a ton of personality, from the very start of her intro in the character select screen (complete with a signature "hohoho!" laugh) into her animations". He concluded that Karin has a learning curve and recommends practicing extensively with her in training mode before fighting other players, and recommends her for players who have a predilection for a rushdown playstyle. Todd Ciolek from Anime News Network welcomed Karin's inclusion into Street Fighter V, describing her as a persistently popular character in spite of her few overall appearances in the Street Fighter game series. However he formed the view that Karin looks awkwardly "outsized and drained, like she's in Rule of Rose or a Silent Hill game" when framed in the game's visual style where characters have big hands and exaggerated physiques, which is "cartoonish and verge on the grotesque". Ciolek emphasized that this is at odds with her design in Alpha 3 where she is a "petite contrast of dainty Nellie Oleson ringlets, elegant posturing, and vicious multi-hit punches". Ciolek also questioned Sakura's omission from the launch roster of V, and claimed that Karin is not the same without her relationship dynamic with Sakura.

The character's iteration in Street Fighter V have achieved a level of prominence in professional esports tournaments. American professional fighting game player Justin Wong won several tournaments, including DreamHack 2016, using Karin. Another professional fighting game player, Victor "Punk" Woodley attained notoriety within the Street Fighter community for his execution and optimization of Karin, considered to be his signature character for Street Fighter V. A match between Punk against Masato "Bonchan" Takahashi in the VSFighting 2019 tournament held in Birmingham, England, where both players used Karin for their game of Street Fighter V: Arcade Edition in the grand final bracket, was described as a highlight of the event. Although Karin is a mainstay character closely associated with Punk in Street Fighter V tournament matches, Bonchan's victory over Punk using a character not typically associated with his playstyle is credited as an example that demonstrates the importance of mastering the game's fundamental techniques for professional play. In an article published by Red Bull in October 2019, the winner of Red Bull UK's 2019 Street Fighter tournament Marcus 'Packz' Parker recommended Karin as one of the best characters to play for Street Fighter V.

Matt Gerardi from A.V. Club ranked Karin's character theme in Street Fighter V as the best out of the launch roster characters. He praised its "slick, soft funk" as an "exceptional new entrant in the illustrious lineage of weird, jazzy songs from fighting games" which blends a combination of horns, guitar tunes and a keyboard solo which is more reminiscent of Persona 4 as opposed to a traditional Street Fighter soundtrack.

In popular culture
Some of Karin's fighting moves from Street Fighter V have been recreated by professional stunt performers and experienced martial artists Gemma Nguyen and Noah Felder on the YouTube channel Gamology. A move where Karin executes a front kick without putting her foot down and then switches to another kick is described by Nguyen as a common technique in real-life martial arts.

See also
List of Street Fighter characters

References

External links
 Karin Kanzuki on the official Street Fighter V website 
 Karin Character Date on the official Capcom website
 SFV: Karin Official Character Guide on the Official Street Fighter YouTube channel

Female characters in anime and manga
Female characters in video games
Fictional businesspeople in video games
Fictional Japanese people in video games
Fictional martial artists in video games
Fictional mixed martial artists
Street Fighter characters
Teenage characters in video games
Video game characters introduced in 1998
Capcom protagonists
Woman soldier and warrior characters in video games